Abelardo Barrientos Delgado, aka Lalo (November 27, 1931 – July 23, 2004), was a Chicano writer, community organizer, and poet. His work was important in establishing the Chicano poetry movement.

He was a major contributor to the Chicano Movement of the 1960s and 1970s. A professor in Metropolitan State University of Denver's Chicano/a Studies Department for 17 years, he was honored by the city of Denver posthumously in 2005 with the Dr. Martin Luther King Jr. Lifetime Achievement Award. In 2004, he was posthumously named Denver's first Poet Laureate. Metropolitan State University hosts the annual Lalo Delgado Poetry Festival; which celebrates Delgado as a social justice poet and "the grandfather of Chicano and Chicana poetry in this country."

Delgado was awarded the Tonatiuh-Quinto Sol Award for literature in 1977.

Personal life 
Born in Boquilla de Conchos, Chihuahua, Mexico, Delgado moved to El Paso, Texas in 1943. He grew up in a tenement occupied by 23 families sharing three bathrooms, learning English from a boys club after school. Delgado organized his first protest while in school, refusing to sing the National Anthem and eventually convincing his classmates to sing in Spanish instead.

Lalo was married to Lola Estrada and had eight children.

References

1931 births
2004 deaths
People from Chihuahua (state)
American activists
20th-century American poets